Ralf Bremmer (born 21 August 1961) is a German wrestler. He competed in the men's freestyle 130 kg at the 1988 Summer Olympics.

References

External links
 

1961 births
Living people
German male sport wrestlers
Olympic wrestlers of West Germany
Wrestlers at the 1988 Summer Olympics
Sportspeople from Bochum